Route 55 was a tram route on the Melbourne tram network. The 12.5 kilometre route operated between Coburg West and Domain Interchange, was operated out of Essendon depot with Z and B-class trams. It ceased on 30 April 2017 and was replaced by route 58.

History
Proposals for a tram or railway route to West Coburg date to the late 19th century. Construction of the tramway began in 1923, initially only to Brunswick West, then extended to Bell Street in 1927. The tramway was extended south to St Kilda Road during World War II to alleviate congestion during the war. Proposed extensions north of Bell Street have not been constructed.

Until November 1986, route 55 operated from West Coburg to St Kilda Beach via William Street, St Kilda Road and Fitzroy Street. Route 56 offered a truncated service that ran from West Coburg to Domain Road. Following the opening of a terminating platform at Domain Interchange on 14 November 1986, through-routing to St Kilda Beach was discontinued.

Between 1971 and July 2005 route 55 and 56 (before 1986) only operated on Mondays to Saturdays. On Sundays, the section from West Coburg to the city was covered by route 68.

During the 2006 Commonwealth Games the route was merged with route 5 to Malvern to alleviate congestion along St Kilda Road.

On 30 April 2017 as part of works associated with the closure of Domain Interchange and construction of Anzac railway station, route 55 ceased. It was replaced by route 58 that traversed the same route as route 55, and then continued south from Domain Interchange to Toorak, partly replacing route 8.

Route description
The route ran along Melville Road from the Bell Street intersection, then Dawson Street, Grantham Street, through to Royal Park along a scenic track passing the Royal Park Golf Course and the Melbourne Zoo, coming out at Flemington Road where it intersected Abbotsford Street, then it travelled along Peel Street, William Street, Flinders Lane, Market Street, Queens Bridge, Queensbridge Street, Kings Way and finally Park Street before terminating at the Domain Interchange.

Route 68
Route 68 was a Sunday-only version of the route 55 service from West Coburg, diverting at Haymarket roundabout to operate along Elizabeth Street to Flinders Street station, instead of along William Street from Domain Interchange. First operated on 6 July 1971, the route was withdrawn on 31 July 2005 when route 55 was altered to operate seven days a week.

Operation
Routes 55 was operated out of Essendon depot with Z and B class trams.

Route map

References

External links

055
1995 establishments in Australia
2017 disestablishments in Australia